Yonsei Law School (연세대학교 법학전문대학원) is one of the professional graduate schools of Yonsei University, located in Seoul, South Korea. As a member of SKY (universities), it is known as one of the top three law schools in Korea.

History
It was formerly known as Yonsei University College of Law.

Alumni 

 College of Law

Park, Sang-ki Former Minister of DOJ  

Yoon, Kwan   Former Chief Justice of SCOURT

Roh, Gun-ho   Son of the Former President, Roh, Moo-hyun

 Law School 

Choi, Sooyeon   CEO of Naver Corporation

Website 
 Official Website

 Yonsei University
 Law schools in South Korea

ko:연세대학교 법학전문대학원